The 1930 Tuskegee Golden Tigers football team was an American football team that represented Tuskegee University as a member of the Southern Intercollegiate Athletic Conference (SIAC) during the 1930 college football season. In their eighth season under head coach Cleveland Abbott, Tuskegee compiled an 11–0–1 record, won the SIAC championship, shut out five of 12 opponents, defeated  in the Prairie View Bowl, and outscored all opponents by a total of 338 to 44. The team was recognized as the black college national champion. 

Key players included Benjamin F. Stevenson and fullback Shorty Shanklin.

Schedule

References

Tuskegee
Tuskegee Golden Tigers football seasons
Black college football national champions
College football undefeated seasons
Tuskegee Golden Tigers football